Half Moon Street may refer to:

 Half Moon Street, London, a street in Mayfair, London
 Half Moon Street (film), a 1986 film